Çıraqlı is a village in the Lachin District of Azerbaijan. The village came under occupation of Armenian forces on 17 May 1992 during the First Nagorno-Karabakh war. It was returned to Azerbaijan in 2020 as part of the 2020 Nagorno-Karabakh ceasefire agreement.

References 

Nagorno-Karabakh
Villages in Azerbaijan
Populated places in Lachin District